Builder's tea, also known as a builder's brew or gaffer's tea, is a British English colloquial term for a strong cup of tea. It takes its name from the inexpensive tea commonly drunk by labourers taking a break. A builder's tea is typically brewed in a mug with the tea contained in a teabag (as opposed to loose leaves in a teapot), with a small amount of milk usually added after either stirring the tea or leaving it to stand and infuse. It is often taken with one or more teaspoons of white sugar, but this is optional.

Characteristics
Builder's tea is typically robust and has a rich, dark beige colour.

The name was chosen because workers in the British building trade typically drink many cups of tea during their working day. The term has widespread use throughout both Great Britain and Ireland. Research from the Social Issues Research Centre found that people performing construction work found tea "both soothing and stimulating".

A 2013 article in the Daily Express noted that building workers are drinking less tea than they used to, preferring alternatives such as coffee, cappuccinos and lattes, as well as soft drinks.

See also

Tea in the United Kingdom

References

Blended tea
English drinks
Tea in the United Kingdom